Pin Valley National Park is a National park of India located in the Spiti Valley in the Lahaul and Spiti district, in the state of Himachal Pradesh.  It is located in far northern India. It is part of Cold Desert (biosphere reserve).

History
Steeped in historical and present day Buddhist Tibetan culture, the area has many Tibetan Buddhist influences, evident architecturally in monasteries and stupas, and in the daily living of its residents and lamas.

Geography 
The park is located in the desert habitat of the Spiti Valley, within the Cold Desert Biosphere Reserve, in the Himalayas region. Spreading south of Dhankar Gompa near the Tibetan border, the park marks the border between the formerly separate districts of Lahaul and Spiti.

Ecology
With its snow laden unexplored higher reaches and slopes, the Park forms a natural habitat for a number of endangered animals including the Snow Leopards and Siberian ibex.

Flora and fauna

Because of the park's high altitude and extreme temperatures, the vegetation density is sparse, consisting mostly of alpine trees and groves of Himalayan cedar (Cedrus deodara). In summer, birds such as the Himalayan snowcock, chukar partridge, snow partridge, finches and choughs flourish in the park.

Medicinal Plants 

Some plants within the park's alpine habitats have significant medicinal properties. Twenty-two rare and endangered medicinal plant species, have been discovered in and around Pin Valley National Park, which are distributed over 10 different habitat types. Aconitum rotundifolium, Arnebia euchroma, Ephedra gerardiana, Ferula jaeschkeana, Hyoscymus niger are the threatened but medicinally important plants occur in this national park.

See also
National parks in Himachal Pradesh
Mud village, Spiti

References

External links

himachaltourism.nic.in

National parks in Himachal Pradesh
Geography of Lahaul and Spiti district
Protected areas established in 1958
1958 establishments in Himachal Pradesh